This is a list of episodes from the fifth season of Happy Days.

Cast

Main
 Ron Howard as Richie Cunningham
 Henry Winkler as Arthur "Fonzie" Fonzarelli
 Marion Ross as Marion Cunningham
 Anson Williams as Warren "Potsie" Weber
 Don Most as Ralph Malph
 Erin Moran as Joanie Cunningham
 Al Molinaro as Alfred "Al" Delvecchio
 Scott Baio as Chachi Arcola
 Tom Bosley as Howard Cunningham

Guest
 Lynda Goodfriend as Lori Beth Allen
 Morgan Fairchild as socialite Cynthia Holmes
 Ed Peck as Officer Kirk
 Suzi Quatro as Leather Tuscadero 
Lorrie Mahaffey as Jennifer Jerome
 Robin Williams as Mork

Broadcast history
The season aired Tuesdays at 8:00-8:30 pm (EST).

Episodes

References

Happy Days 05
1977 American television seasons
1978 American television seasons